Ceccaceras is an extinct genus of ammonites in the family Ceratitidae. Species are known from the Triassic of United States (Nevada).

References

External links
 Ceccaceras at The Paleobiology Database

Ceratitidae
Ceratitida genera
Fossil taxa described in 2005